Valiabad Khosrow Khani (also Romanized as Valīābād Khosrow Khānī) is a village in Itivand-e Shomali Rural District, Kakavand District, Delfan County, Lorestan Province, Iran. At the 2006 census, its population was 35, in 5 families.

References 

Towns and villages in Delfan County